Sterrett Islands is a small group of islands in Amundsen Sea, lying 5 nautical miles (9 km) northwest of Edwards Islands and 5 nautical miles (9 km) west of Canisteo Peninsula. Plotted from air photos taken by U.S. Navy Squadron VX-6 in January, 1960. Named by Advisory Committee on Antarctic Names (US-ACAN) for James M. Sterrett, biologist with the Byrd Antarctic Expedition in 1933–35.

See also 
 List of Antarctic and sub-Antarctic islands

Islands of Ellsworth Land